Cape Forlorn is a 1931 British drama film directed by Ewald André Dupont and starring Fay Compton, Frank Harvey and Ian Hunter. It was the English-language version of a British International Pictures multiple-language production with France and Germany which also made Le cap perdu and Menschen im Käfig. The film is also known as The Love Storm.

Plot
A lighthouse on a lonely coast of New Zealand is looked after by lighthouse keeper William Kell. Kell marries Eileen, a dancer in a cabaret, who winds up having an affair with Kell's assistant, Cass. Eileen then begins flirting with a stranger, Kingsley, an absconder who is rescued from the wreck of a motor launch. Kingsley and Cass quarrel; the woman rushes upon the scene with a revolver, fires blindly, and Cass Is shot dead.

Cast
 Fay Compton as Eileen Kell
 Frank Harvey as William Kell
 Ian Hunter as Gordon Kingsley
 Edmund Willard as Henry Cass
 Donald Calthrop as Parsons

Original play

The movie was based on a play which premiered in 1930. It was written by Frank Harvey who appeared in the original cast.

Production
Shooting took place in late 1930 and it was made in English, French and German.

Release
The film was originally banned in Australia by the censor but this was overturned on appeal after a number of cuts were agreed upon.

Reviews were poor.

Shortly after the film was released in Australia, Harvey appeared in a production of the play at the Criterion Theatre in Sydney. Harvey said this was in part because the film version had so changed his play.

References

External links

1931 films
1931 drama films
Films shot at British International Pictures Studios
British multilingual films
British films based on plays
Films directed by E. A. Dupont
British drama films
British black-and-white films
Works set in lighthouses
1930s English-language films
1930s British films